The Louisiana Fur and Wildlife Festival is called "One of the Oldest and Coldest" festival in Louisiana. Takes place in the heart of winter, the second weekend of January.  The Louisiana Fur and Wildlife Festival was chosen as a Top 20 Event by the Southeast Tourism Society in 1989, 2012 and 2013. This award is a coveted honor among 12 member states.

Industries honored
The festival honors ten native industries, all vital to Cameron Parish, on a rotating basis.

 Cattle
 Energy
 Shrimp
 Hunting and Wildlife
 Fur and Alligator
 Oyster
 Fishing
 Crabbing

In conjunction with each festival, a queen's pageant is held; an individual is named King Fur to represent the industry being honored; a cookbook is published which contains photographs and winners from the previous festival; a parade is held, and the festival hosts a delegation from its sister festival, the National Outdoor Show from Cambridge MD.

Festival contests include oyster shucking, muskrat and nutria skinning, skeet shooting, trap setting, and duck and goose calling, and a Gumbo Cook-off. A booth located on the fairgrounds showcases the history of the festival. The festival also features carnival rides, exhibits, live music and dancing, and regional food.

History

Inaugural festival
The event originated in 1955 when U.S. Congressman Theo Ashton Thompson arranged the first fur and wildlife competition.

The congressman of Cambridge, Maryland challenged Representative Thompson to send a local resident to compete in the National Fur Skinning Contest. Fifty-two-year-old Leon Hebert, a 25-year trapper, from Cameron was sent to the National Outdoor Show where he placed fifth in the nation that year.

A small group of people met during the summer of 1955 in the Cameron Courthouse Building, to make plans for the first festival.  Whitney Stine was chairman.   Representatives of community organizations included: Whitney Stine - Cameron Lion's Club ((Lions Clubs International)), Edward Swindell, Sr. - Cameron Lion's Club, Hadley Fontenot - County Agent, Alvin Dyson - State Representative, Ray Burleigh - Cameron Lion's Club, Joe O'Donnell -Cameron Lion's Club, Mrs. Iva Free - Home Demonstration Agent, Roberta Rogers - Home Demonstration Club, Geneva Griffith - Home Demonstration Club and Sam Tarlton - Lake Charles Television and Radio Station. 

From this group of organizers came the Louisiana Fur & Wildlife Festival. The first festival was funded by the Cameron Parish Police Jury and private donations. This was to become known as "ONE OF THE OLDEST AND COLDEST FESTIVALS IN LOUISIANA" In 1962 and 1973 the festival was postponed for one week due to a severe cold wave.

Jennings B. Jones, Jr. served as master of ceremonies for the program on Dec 2 and 3, 1955. It was presided over by Cameron County Agent Hadley Fontenot, first festival president.

Seventeen-year-old Vida Bess Brown, from Abbeville, was crowned "Miss Outdoor of Louisiana" by Ted O'Neal, Chief of the Fur and Bottoms Division of the Louisiana Wildlife Commission. She was presented with a nutria stole, a bouquet of roses by the Cameron Service Garage, and an expense paid trip to the National Outdoors Show in Cambridge, Maryland. The National Outdoor Show became a "Sister Festival" with the Cameron Festival. The two exchanged fur skinners and festival queens each year and the tradition continues today.

Of 34 contestants, Meredith Giles was named the first "Cameron Parish Queen".  Eleven-year-old J. A. Miller captured the Louisiana Junior Duck Calling contest and in years to come he became the World Champion Fur Skinner, following in the footsteps of his father Fletcher, and teaching his daughter Selika the art with her becoming the Women's Champion.  His wife, Mary Jane Miller, held the Local and National Women's title many times.

Second festival
The second annual festival was held on January 11–12, 1957 and $5000.00 in cash and trips were awarded along with fur coats to the Fur Queen contestants.
Nancy Precht was crowned Fur Queen by Louisiana House of Representative, Alvin Dyson.  She represented the festival at the Mardi Gras Ball in Washington, D.C. where she was presented to Vice-President and Mrs. Nixon.  This tradition continues to the present time.

Floats were usually constructed in warehouses of the local menhaden plants, mud houses, garages, or anywhere workers could get out of the cold. Roland "Bolo" Trosclair was in charge of the parade at that time. 
  
A raccoon was chosen as mascot for the festival. A contest of the area school children determined that Sha-oui would be the name of the mascot.

In Dec 1956, festival authorities invited major fur production parishes to attend; St Charles, St Bernard, St John, St. Mary, Jefferson, Plaquemines, Terrebonne, Lafourche, Iberia, Vermilion and Cameron.

Subsequent festivals
In 1969 the first King Fur is selected.  King Fur I, Jack T. Styron represents the Menhaden (pogy fish) industry for the 14th annual Fur and Wildlife Festival. 

In 1972 the first Fur Festival Cookbook is published and continues today.

Parishes with invitations to compete for the Louisiana Fur and Wildlife Festival Queen Crown: Acadia, Allen, Ascension, Assumption, Avoyelles, Beauregard, Calcasieu, Cameron, Evangeline, Iberia, Jefferson, Jefferson Davis, Lafayette, Lafourche, Livingston, Natchitoches, Plaquemines, Rapides, Saint Bernard, Saint Charles, Saint James, Saint John the Baptist, Saint Landry, Saint Martin, Saint Mary, Saint Tammany, Sabine, Vermillion, Vernon, Washington, Tangipahoa, and Terrebonne.

Cameron Elementary School was the annual staging ground for the Louisiana Fur and Wildlife Festival pageants until Hurricane Rita. After the 2005 storm, all that remain of the auditorium were the steel girders. The festival was canceled in 2006 due to the devastation of Hurricane Rita.

Activities for the 2007 50th annual Louisiana Fur and Wildlife Festival kicked off with pageants at the Lake Charles Civic Center's Rosa Hart Theater.  The festival activities returned to the grounds of the old Cameron Elementary School in Cameron.

The Fur queen invited several of her fellow festival queens to see her Parish anyway, both in its devastation and its natural splendor. 
 
In the early months of 2010, the Cameron Parish 4-H Junior Leaders complete a video documentary on the history of the Louisiana Fur and Wildlife Festival. The Youth Leaders interviewed past festival participants, contestants and queens and compiled the stories into a documentary. Cameron Communications is a Festival $5,000 corporate sponsor now and in the next several years.

The 54th annual Fur and Wildlife Festival held January 13–14, 2012 in downtown Cameron LA featured dog trials, back for the first time since Hurricane Rita.

With the 2020 Hurricanes, Laura and Delta, and COVID-19 pandemic causing 2021 to go on hiatus, the 63rd was deferred to 2022.

The 63rd Louisiana Fur and Wildlife Festival was held January 8, 2022 at the Burton Complex in Lake Charles, Louisiana.

The 64th Louisiana Fur and Wildlife Festival will return January 13-14, 2023 to the Historic Cameron Courthouse fairgrounds in Cameron, Louisiana.

List of festivals

References 

Festivals in Louisiana
Annual fairs
1955 establishments in Louisiana
Festivals established in 1955